John W. Hetrick (July 23, 1918 - April 8, 1999), from Newport, Pennsylvania, was an American engineer who is credited for inventing the airbag.  Hetrick originally called the device a "Safety cushion assembly for automotive vehicles."  He built the original prototype on his kitchen table in 1952, and applied for a patent on Aug 5, 1952.  

He has served as an industrial engineer in the United States Navy and took notable design influences from compressed air torpedoes.

Hetrick received a US Patent #2,649,311 on August 18, 1953 for an "airbag".  He did not receive much income for his invention, since automakers did not offer airbags widely until after his patent had expired in 1971.  

Hetrick was awarded the Golden Gear Award for his invention.

Further reading

References

20th-century American engineers
1918 births
1999 deaths
People from Newport, Pennsylvania